Brian Clark (born May 5, 1974) is a former Canadian Football League linebacker who played eleven seasons in the CFL for three teams.

1974 births
Living people
American players of Canadian football
Calgary Stampeders players
Canadian football linebackers
Hofstra Pride football players
Montreal Alouettes players
Sportspeople from Quincy, Illinois
Winnipeg Blue Bombers players